Joan Mott (1921–1994) was an English physiologist and zoologist who worked for most of her career at the University of Oxford's Nuffield Institute for Medical Research. Following wartime work on anti-fouling of ships her main research interest was in the circulatory system, especially the fetal renin–angiotensin system.

Mott was a founding fellow of and Vicegerent of Wolfson College, Oxford.
She died on 21 April 1994.

The Joan Mott Prize Lecture of The Physiological Society is named in her honour.

References

Alumni of Newnham College, Cambridge
British physiologists
1921 births
1994 deaths
20th-century British zoologists
Fellows of Wolfson College, Oxford
Women zoologists
Women physiologists